This is a list of romance films.

 10 Things I Hate About You
 After (2019)
 500 Days of Summer
 Aashiqui
 Aashiqui 2
 About Time, 2013
 Across the Universe
 An Affair to Remember
 The Age of Adaline
 The Age of Innocence
 All That Heaven Allows
 Amelie, 2001
 Angel Eyes
 Annie Hall
 An Officer and a Gentleman
 The Anonymous Venetian, 1970
 The Artist
 At Cafe 6, 2016
 Autumn in New York
 Band Baaja Baaraat
 Be Together, 2015
 Beautiful Thing
 Beauty and the Beast, 2005
 Before Midnight, 2013
 Before Sunrise
 Before Sunset
 The Beloved, 2015
 The Best of Me
 Beyond Borders
 Beyond the Lights
 Big Red Envelope
 Bitter Love, 2014
 Blue is the Warmest Colour
 Blue Valentine
 Blood Ransom, 2014
 Bobby, 1973
 Bounce
 The Break-up Season, 2014
 Breakfast at Tiffany's
 The Bridges of Madison County
 Brief Encounter
 Brokeback Mountain
 Call Me by Your Name (film)
 Camille, 1936
 Casablanca
 Charlie St. Cloud
 Chandani
 Cherish in Love, 2014
 The Choice, 2016
 City Lights
 City of Angels
 Close Range Love, 2014
 Closer, 2004
 Crazy Rich Asians, 2018
 Dawn Break Up, 2015
 Dear John, 2010
 Devdas, 2002
 Different from the Others
 Dil Se..
 Dil To Pagal Hai
 Dilwale Dulhania Le Jayenge
 Dirty Dancing
 Dirty Dancing: Havana Nights
 Doctor Zhivago
 Dying Young
 The Earrings of Madame de...
 Endless Love, 1981
 Endless Love, 2014
 The Eighth House
 Embrace Again
 The English Patient
 Eternal Sunshine of the Spotless Mind
 Ex Fighting, 2014
 Fall in Love Like a Star, 2015
 Falling In Love, 1984
 Fanaa, 2006
 The Fault in Our Stars
 Fifty Shades of Grey 
 Five Minutes to Tomorrow, 2014
 Fleet of Time, 2014
 Flower's Curse, 2014
 Forever Love, 2014
 Forever Young, 2014
 Forget All Remember, 2014
 Friends with Benefits
 From Prada to Nada 2011
 Fitoor
 Five Feet Apart, 2019 
 The Glass Mountain
 Gone with the Wind, 1939
 The Goodbye Girl
 Griffin and Phoenix, 1976
 Griffin & Phoenix, 2006
 Hanamizuki
 Here on Earth (film)
 Holiday, 1938
 Hello, My Dolly Girlfriend
 Hum Dil De Chuke Sanam
 I Just Wanna Hug You 
 If I Stay 
 If Only
 The Illusionist, 2006
 In the Mood for Love
 In Your Eyes, 2014
 Initiation Love, 2015
 Interlude, 1968
 The Jane Austen Book Club
Jab We Met, 2007
 Kate & Leopold, 2001
 Kites, 2010
 The Lake House
 La La Land
 Last Chance Harvey
 The Last Song, 2010
 Last Tango in Paris
 The Lead Singer and Dancer and His Woman, 2015
 L'Eclisse
 Let's Get Married, 2015
 Letter from an Unknown Woman
 Letters to Juliet
 The Longest Ride
 Love, Simon, 2018
 Love & Basketball
 Love & Other Drugs
 Love Exposure
 Love Happens, 2009
 Love O2O (2016)
 Love on the Cloud
 Love Actually, 2014
 Love Story, 1970
 Love's Whirlpool, 2014
 Lovestruck
 The Lucky One
 Mad Love, 1995
 Man's Way with Women
 Manhattan, 1979
 Meet Joe Black
 Message in a Bottle
 Midnight In Paris
 "Moh"
 Mr. & Mrs. Smith, 2005
 Mughal-e-Azam
 Murmur of the Hearts, 2015
 My Hawaiian Discovery
 My Man, 2014
 My Sassy Girl, 2008
 Mungaru Male
 Nana to Kaoru, 2011
 Nana to Kaoru: Chapter 2, 2012
Never Gone
 Never Said Goodbye, 2016
 Nights in Rodanthe
 No Strings Attached, 2011
 The Notebook, 2004
 Notting Hill
 One Day, 2011
 One Step Away
 O Kadhal Kanmani
 Otoko no Isshō, 2014
 The Palm Beach Story
 Paper Towns
 Parineeta, 2005
 Pearl Harbor
 The Phantom of the Opera, 2004
 Pompeii
 Pride and Prejudice, 2005
 The Princess Diaries
 The Proposal, 2009
 P.S. I Love You
 Punch-Drunk Love
 The Queens, 2015
 The Reader
 Relationship Dilemma, 2015
 Reds
 Remember Me, 2010
 Roja
 Romeo + Juliet, 1996
 Romeo and Juliet, 1968
 The Room, 2003
 Safe Haven
 Say Anything
 (Sex) Appeal, 2014
 Scott Pilgrim vs. The World
 Shakespeare in Love
 Singin' in the Rain
 Sleepless in Seattle
 Shelter, 2007
 Slumdog Millionaire 
 Something Borrowed
 Something's Gotta Give
 Somewhere in Time
 The Song of the Blood-Red Flower, 1971
 Sophie's Choice
 Sorry, I Love You, 2014
 South of the Clouds, 2014
 Spicy Hot in Love, 2016
 Splash
 Spring, 2014
 Sundays at Tiffany's 
 Sunrise: A Song of Two Humans
 Swiss Army Man
 The Shape of Water
 The Twilight Saga
 Titanic, 1997
 Tristan & Isolde
 The Vow, 2012
 A Walk to Remember
 Warm Bodies
 Water for Elephants
 When Harry Met Sally...
 Where the Heart Is, 2000
 Who Moved My Dream, 2014
 Wimbledon
 Working Girl
 World of Delight, 2015
  While You Were Sleeping
  Written on the Wind
 You Are My Sunshine, 2015
 You've Got Mail
 Zama Arman, 2013

See also
 List of romantic comedy films
 List of interracial romance films
 List of romance anime
 Chick flick

References

 
Romance